Xuzhou (530) is a Type 054A frigate of the People's Liberation Army Navy. She was commissioned on 27 January 2008.

Development and design 

The Type 054A carries HQ-16 medium-range air defence missiles and anti-submarine missiles in a vertical launching system (VLS) system. The HQ-16 has a range of up to 50 km, with superior range and engagement angles to the Type 054's HQ-7. The Type 054A's VLS uses a hot launch method; a shared common exhaust system is sited between the two rows of rectangular launching tubes.

The four AK-630 close-in weapon systems (CIWS) of the Type 054 were replaced with two Type 730 CIWS on the Type 054A. The autonomous Type 730 provides improved reaction time against close-in threats.

Construction and career 
Xuzhou was launched on 30th September 2006 at the Huangpu Wenchong Shipyard in Guangzhou. Commissioned on 1st January 2008 in Zhoushan.

On September 26, 2014, Xuzhou, along with the East China Sea Fleet of the People’s Liberation Army Navy, organized a real-fire drill in a complex underwater acoustic environment in a certain area of the South China Sea, and conducted continuous attacks on submarines by surface fleets and successive submarine ambushes, and research and practice for other subjects.

In February 2016, Xuzhou launched a major exercise mission in the East China Sea. On March 20th, an accident occurred when the oil pipeline ruptured on the way back. Fortunately, the crew handled it in time to avoid flashover. On March 26, Xuzhou began to continue its mission.

Gallery

References 

2007 ships
Ships built in China
Type 054 frigates